The Atwood Campus Center is the student center of Alaska Pacific University in Anchorage, Alaska.  It is a two-story square building  on each side, elevated on a podium extending ten or more feet to each side.  It is flanked by two residence halls, which, although also  in height, have three stories.  This complex was designed by Edward Durell Stone and built in 1966, when the school was known as Alaska Methodist University.  This complex has been listed on the National Register of Historic Places for its significance as the site of a major 1971 conference of more than 600 Alaska Native representatives, at which they formally accepted the Alaska Native Claims Settlement Act, landmark legislation which fundamentally altered the handling of land ownership and use in the state, particularly with respect to native title, which had long clouded many real estate transfers.

The center is effectively managed by the student population, providing spaces for meeting and relaxation, as well as a kitchen and dining area, and offices for a variety of student services.  The residence halls continue to be used as student housing: the south hall houses incoming freshmen, while the north hall houses upperclass students in suites.

See also
National Register of Historic Places listings in Anchorage, Alaska

References

1966 establishments in Alaska
Alaska Pacific University
Buildings and structures completed in 1966
Buildings and structures on the National Register of Historic Places in Anchorage, Alaska
University and college buildings on the National Register of Historic Places in Alaska